Vetovo Municipality is a municipality (obshtina) in Ruse Province, Central-North Bulgaria, located in the western parts of Ludogorie geographical region, part of the Danubian Plain. It is named after its administrative centre - the town of Vetovo.

The main road E70 crosses the area in the western part of the municipality, connecting the province centre of Ruse with the city of Razgrad and the eastern operating part of Hemus motorway.

Settlements 

Vetovo Municipality includes the following 6 places (towns are shown in bold):

Demography 
The following table shows the change of the population during the last four decades. Since 1992 Vetovo Municipality has comprised the former municipality of Senovo and the numbers in the table reflect this unification.

Religion 
According to the latest Bulgarian census of 2011, the religious composition, among those who answered the optional question on religious identification, was the following:

See also
Provinces of Bulgaria
Municipalities of Bulgaria
List of cities and towns in Bulgaria

References

External links
 Official website 

Municipalities in Ruse Province